Milan Mach (born February 17, 1972 in Čeladná) is a Czech sport shooter. He competed at the 1996 Summer Olympics in the men's 50 metre rifle prone event, in which he placed fifth.

References

1972 births
Living people
ISSF rifle shooters
Czech male sport shooters
Shooters at the 1996 Summer Olympics
Olympic shooters of the Czech Republic
People from Frýdek-Místek District
Sportspeople from the Moravian-Silesian Region